In mathematics, a stably free module is a module which is close to being free.

Definition
A finitely generated module M over a ring R is stably free if there exist free finitely generated modules F and G over R such that

Properties
 A projective module is stably free if and only if it possesses a finite free resolution.
 An infinitely generated module is stably free if and only if it is free.

See also 
 Free object
 Eilenberg–Mazur swindle
 Hermite ring

References 

Module theory
Free algebraic structures